Isami (written: 勇) is a masculine Japanese given name. Notable people with the name include:

Isami Doi (1903–1965), American printmaker and painter
Isami Enomoto (1929-2016), American ceramicist
, Japanese professional wrestler
 (1834–1868), Japanese swordsman and commander of the Shinsengumi

Fictional Characters
Isami, a female character from Log Horizon
Isami Aldini, a character from Food Wars!: Shokugeki no Soma
Isami Hanaoka, female protagonist from anime and manga series Soar High! Isami

Other uses
Soar High! Isami anime series broadcast by NHK

Japanese masculine given names